Wings of a Honky-Tonk Angel is the only studio album of American country music artist Brad Martin. Released on Epic Records in 2002, it features the singles "Before I Knew Better" and "Rub Me the Right Way", which both charted on the Billboard Hot Country Songs charts that year.

Track listing

Personnel
Larry Beaird – acoustic guitar
Mike Brignardello – bass guitar
Lisa Cochran – background vocals
Melodie Crittenden – background vocals
Eric Darken – percussion
Dan Dugmore – steel guitar
Paul Franklin – steel guitar
Tony Harrell – synthesizer, keyboards
Aubrey Haynie – fiddle
Wes Hightower – background vocals
Jim Horn – saxophone
John Barlow Jarvis – piano, keyboards
Kirk "Jelly Roll" Johnson – harmonica
John Jorgenson – electric guitar
B. James Lowry – acoustic guitar
Liana Manis – background vocals
Brad Martin – lead vocals, background vocals
Brent Mason – electric guitar
Greg Morrow – drums
Russ Pahl – banjo
Michael Rhodes – bass guitar
John Wesley Ryles – background vocals
Neil Thrasher – background vocals
Billy Joe Walker, Jr. – acoustic guitar, electric guitar
Biff Watson – acoustic guitar
Curtis Young – background vocals

Chart performance

References

2002 debut albums
Brad Martin albums
Epic Records albums
Albums produced by Billy Joe Walker Jr.